Aruagint is the third album by Norwegian black/thrash metal band Sarke. It was released 20 September 2013 via Indie Recordings.

History 
In April 2013, it was announced that Sarke would have released their third album Aruagint on 24 May 2013 and that the artwork was created by known artist Maxime Taccardi. Anyway, it was announced that the release date had been postponed and that the album would be released in 2014.

On 28 August 2013, it was announced that the new release date was 20 September 2013 for Norway, Germany, Austria and Switzerland, and 23 September 2013 for the rest of the world.

Track listing

Credits 
Band
 Sarke – bass
 Nocturno Culto – vocals
 Asgeir Mickelson – drums
 Steinar Gundersen – guitar
 Anders Hunstad – keyboards

Production
 Lars-Erik Westby – producer

Artwork
 Maxime Taccardi

References 

Indie Recordings albums
2013 albums
Sarke albums